Ile District is a district of Almaty Region in Kazakhstan. 
The district is named for the Ili River ("Ile" in Kazakh). Its administrative center is the settlement of Otegen Batyr. Population:

References

Districts of Kazakhstan
Almaty Region